Field Rock is a rock outcrop  south of Teyssier Island, on the coast of Mac. Robertson Land, Antarctica. It was mapped from Australian National Antarctic Research Expeditions surveys and air photos, 1954–62 and named by the Antarctic Names Committee of Australia for E.D. Field, a cook at the nearby Mawson Station, 1957.

References 

Rock formations of Mac. Robertson Land